Passer by may refer to:

 Passer By (song), a 2005 single by Mattafix
 Passer By (TV film), a 2004 BBC television drama

See also 
 Passerby (disambiguation)